Kelsey Montague (born 1985) is an American illustrator, interactive street artist, and founder of the #WhatLiftsYou global campaign. She is best known for her large scale, interactive street murals around the world, which provide opportunities for people to step into the work and become a living work of art.

Biography 
Montague comes from a family of artists. Both her mom, Linda Montague, and her grandfather, John Rankin, were watercolor painters.  Her sister, Courtney Montague, is her business partner and documents behind the scenes work. Originally from Colorado, Montague has lived in Florence (where she studied art), London , New York City, and Los Angeles. Montague studied Art, Design, and Media (with combined studies) at Richmond University, The American International University in London.

In addition to interactive murals, Montague has published two coloring books for adults, and partnered with S'well and Starbucks to create a limited edition series of 4 bottles with her unique design. She founded the #WhatLiftsYou Campaign to inspire people around the world  to become "living works of art" while considering what most inspires them in their life. Spanning from murals for Parkland shooting survivors, to working with Goldman Global Arts, and even the NFL where she was responsible for creating a mural representing the two final Super Bowl teams. Montague's murals can be found worldwide and shared by numerous celebrities, as well as featured in the Smithsonian American Art Museum (SAAM).

Murals 
A selected list of murals completed by Kelsey Montague as part of her #WhatLiftsYou movement:

 A Growing Meadow (2018) created by request of a teacher at Marjory Stoneman Douglas High School in Parkland, Florida to help reclaim their space, honor their loss, and nurture the healing process of the survivors.
 Super Bowl (2020) two pieces created by request of the NFL to engage fans. Montague was the only female muralist commissioned.
 Universal Studios CityWalk, LA (2017) featuring show stopping wings to greet guests as they enter CityWalk/Universal Studios.
 The Cleo, East Nashville (2018) the largest piece Montague has created in the USA, commissioned by developer Spy Glass.
 Wroclaw, Poland (2017) featuring a massive mural commissioned to be fun,  beautiful, and interactive by an art council in Poland.
 (RED) Room (2017) featuring a rock and roll mural created by Montague for the (RED) Room designed by Johnathan Adler at Andaz West Hollywood. 30% of the sales from this room go to support the (RED) campaign.
 Wynwood Walls (2019) created for a Wynwood Walls 10 year anniversary event for the class of 2019.
 Angels in America (2018) created for the Broadway revival of Angels in America.
 United Airlines (2015, 2020) featuring a mural and video created for UA's charitable partner "Peruvian Hearts", as well as "valentines" for their social media audience.
 Nordstrom and Pop Sugar, Palm Springs (2017) a series of balloons created on a movable wall for influencers to interact with at a Coachella Music Festival inspired event.
 ME, Taylor Swift (2019) created for the launch of Taylor Swift's single "Me!"

Publications 
 Montague, Kelsey (2016). What Lifts You. Harlequin Adult Colouring Books. 
 Montague, Kelsey (2016). What Lifts Your Heart. Harlequin Adult Colouring Books.

References

External links 
 
 #WhatLiftsYou Instagram tag

American illustrators
American women illustrators
1985 births
American muralists
Living people
Women muralists
21st-century American women artists